The Gaza Baptist Church was a Baptist church in Gaza City, Gaza, in the State of Palestine. The church was destroyed during Israeli bombings in 2008, and the church's pastor has subsequently fled the Gaza Strip.

The Gaza Baptist Church was one of only three Christian churches in the Gaza Strip, and the only one that was Protestant and evangelical – the two remaining Christian churches in the Gaza Strip are the Catholic Church of the Holy Family and the Orthodox Church of Saint Porphyrius.

The Gaza Baptist Church had a congregation of about 200 worshippers. Having been adversely affected by ongoing violence related to the Israeli–Palestinian conflict, and as a result of this situation and of ongoing Israeli travel restrictions, the Church's leadership, including its pastor, still lives in exile.

History 
The church was founded in 1954. It is pastored by Hanna Massad, who lives in exile in Jordan since the church was bombed by Israeli forces.

The church, which has historically ministered to approximately 150–250 of Gaza's 2,500 Christians, is one of only three Christian churches in the Gaza Strip. Among Church of Saint Porphyrius and Gaza Latin Church on Zeitoun Street, Gaza Baptist Church is the only Evangelical church in all of Gaza. The church opened Gaza's first public Christian library in 2006.

The church's building is six stories tall. The first two floors are a dedicated public library, which serves both Christian and non-Christian books. The fourth floor is used for outreach, the fifth floor is a lodge for guest workers from abroad, and the sixth floor is used as a worship hall.

Gaza's Christian minority has traditionally enjoyed good relations with the territory's larger Muslim majority. Prior to the breakdown of law and order in 2007, the Church ran youth programs, a library, and medical clinics. It also run a school for about 250 students, many of whom were Muslim.

Collateral damage in bombing raid
On or before February 2007, the Church's public library was subjected to arson attacks on three separate occasions. During an Israeli air raid in December 2008, the building was damaged by a nearby bomb blast.

Fatah–Hamas conflict

Because of its height, unusual in this mostly low-rise city, the Gaza Baptist Church building was repeatedly commandeered by Fatah and Hamas troops as an observation post during the Fatah–Hamas conflict. This resulted in several of Gaza Baptist Church's staff being caught in crossfire. In one instance, a church librarian was hit by gunfire during a firefight between opposing factions. On a similar occasion, the church bus driver, a 22-year-old newlywed, was killed. The Church was raided and temporarily seized by Fatah police in February 2007.

Murder of church leader
In October 2007, one of Gaza Baptist Church's leaders, Rami Ayyad, was kidnapped, publicly beaten, and murdered by unidentified militants. Ayyad had been the manager of Gaza's only Christian bookstore, The Teacher's Bookshop. Following Ayyad's death, Gaza authorities advised Pastor Massad to relocate in order to ensure the safety of himself and his family. As a result of the violence, regular attendance at the church was adversely affected in following months.

Church destruction in Israeli bombings and Israeli blockade
The church was destroyed during Israeli bombings in 2008. Afterwards, seven of the Church's leaders, including its pastor Hanna Massad, left Gaza. Massad moved with his family to Jordan, and five of the other six moved to the West Bank, near Bethlehem. Since then, with rare exceptions, only Massad has been allowed to return by the Israeli authorities. The five who moved to Bethlehem have been prohibited from leaving the area, as a result of which, some have not seen family members for years.

The Israeli blockade of Gaza, according to Massad, has led to "[a] lot of desperation and hopelessness among the people ... more poverty and more suffering". The cost of living has increased and medical equipment is in short supply. However, most agree that the Israeli travel restrictions are even more difficult to endure. Massad summarized the plight of Palestinian Christians as like living "between two fires. Muslim persecution and Israeli occupation."

See also

 Palestinian Christians
 Islamization of Gaza

References

Churches in the Gaza Strip
Former Baptist churches
20th-century Baptist churches
Destroyed churches
Attacks on churches
Attacks on churches in Asia
Church bombings